Melybia thalamita is a species of crab in the family Xanthidae, the only species in the genus Melybia.

References

Xanthoidea
Crustaceans of the Atlantic Ocean
Monotypic arthropod genera